Zone 17 is a zone of the municipality of Ad Dawhah in the state of Qatar. The main districts recorded in the 2015 population census were Al Rufaa and Old Al Hitmi.

Demographics

Land use
The Ministry of Municipality and Environment (MME) breaks down land use in the zone as follows.

References 

Zones of Qatar
Doha